A high-key image consists primarily of light tones, without dark shadows. A photograph or painting so composed features a diminished tonal range of primarily whites and light grays. 
 High key as a term used in describing paintings or photographs is related to but not the same as high-key lighting in cinema or photography.

See also
Low key

References

Photography by genre